Scramble (Lionel Jeffries), also known as Scramble the Mixed-Up Man, is a supervillain appearing in media published by Marvel Comics. Specifically, he was an enemy of Alpha Flight, but for a brief time he was alternately their ally. Scramble is the brother of Madison Jeffries.

Publication history
Scramble first appeared in Alpha Flight #30 (February 1986) and was created by Bill Mantlo and Mike Mignola.

Fictional character biography
Lionel Jeffries and his older brother Madison were mutants: Madison with the ability to alter metallic surfaces and Lionel able to manipulate organic matter. Lionel utilized his power to become a successful surgeon, and later both he and Madison were among the many thousands of Canadians to enlist in the United States Army during the Vietnam War. Madison, who loathed being a mutant, served as a first class mechanic, whereas Lionel craved the opportunity to use his powers for good as a medic. However, Lionel's inability to resurrect many of his fellow soldiers after an explosion dismembered their squad caused him to go insane, and Madison had to use his own powers to assist in restraining him.

In the years following the war, Madison had his raving brother committed to Montreal General Hospital, where he was kept in restraints, before he himself joined the Canadian superhero team Alpha Flight. Shortly afterwards, Alpha Flight leader Heather Hudson found Lionel, discovering his existence on the team's Alphanex computer system (only after bypassing a security lock on Madison's file). Since Madison never informed his teammates of Lionel's existence, Heather assumed the man was a doctor at the hospital, and travelled there in an effort to determine if he was a mutant, and if so recruit him into Alpha Flight. When she discovered Lionel was, in fact, a patient, she was further horrified to behold what she believed to be terrible mistreatment on behalf of the medics who restrained him. However, when Heather attempted to introduce herself as Madison's friend with a handshake, Lionel made physical contact with her and used his powers to brutally warp her body, freeing himself in the process and overtaking the hospital. He now went by the name of Scramble, the Mixed-Up Man, and soon went about altering the hospital staff and patients into hideously deformed zombies (unintentionally resurrecting Deadly Ernest, a deceased Alpha Flight foe, in the process). The insane Scramble believed himself to be little more than a doctor caring for his patients. Alpha Flight soon arrived on the scene to rescue Heather (after tracing her path via Alphanex), and wound up in a brawl with the mutates. Soon, the Jeffries brothers reunited in the hospital morgue, and there Madison fully realized the depth of Scramble's insanity, while also believing there was still good in him. The two brothers clashed, but eventually Madison manipulated Scramble into using his own organic-warping powers on himself, healing his brain from psychosis. The "cured" Scramble reverses much of the damage he did, including Heather's transformation, and vows to return to medicine after getting discharged from the hospital.

Scramble eventually headed the New Life Clinic, an organization that medically assisted Alpha Flight on several occasions, becoming a strong ally of the team in the process. However, gradually, his madness began to return, and he began a secret campaign to create a race of genetic superhumans. He found a partner in Box (Roger Bochs), an Alpha Flight member in his care who also had been suffering from severe psychosis. The vengefully jealous Box requested Scramble to use his powers to repair his damaged legs in an effort to secure the love of his girlfriend and teammate Aurora.  Eventually, it was revealed that Scramble did not use Bochs' excess fatty tissue to repair the man's legs, but rather used manipulated corpse flesh. Despite this odd betrayal, the demented pair still joined forces in Scramble's quest to procure his intended super race. Scramble and Bochs then physically amalgamated into a hideously-deformed creature known as Omega, and attacked Alpha Flight and their trainees Beta Flight when the teams caught on to their plans, first mutating Madison and Lionel's own lab assistant Whitman Knapp (causing Knapp's latent mutant powers to trigger) and then overpowering the rest of the teams.  Madison warps and then dons Box's armor and uses it to fight Omega, during which time the Scramble persona became dominant and killed the Bochs half after the Bochs persona found sanity and attempted to end the battle. After Alpha Flight recovers and defeats Omega (thanks in large part to the efforts of Beta Flight's mind controller the Purple Girl), Madison realized the only way to prevent a future meltdown from his dangerous brother is to kill him. He then proceeded to do so, using weaponry conjured from his Box armor.

Powers and abilities
Scramble was a mutant with the ability to manipulate organic matter via physical contact with varying effects, including physical transmutation and healing of ailments and injuries. He was able to use these powers on himself as well, which allowed him to temporarily cure himself of mental illness and later to merge his physical essence with Roger Bochs' to form the entity Omega.  

As Omega, Scramble/Bochs maintained Scramble's organic manipulation powers, and also appeared to possess superhuman strength and endurance.  Omega's fluid form also enhanced the being's ability to elude and attack opponents.  

Scramble was an excellent doctor and surgeon, thanks in no small part to his mutant abilities.

Scramble also appeared to have a certain empathic link with his brother Madison, the pair being able to sense each other's proximity and general state of mind.

Other versions

House of M
In the House of M reality, Scramble and his brother Madison were in Magneto's mutant army. Magneto positioned them in the Central American country of Santo Rico (after overthrowing its previous dictator El Toro) where they ruled it with an iron fist and experimented on its residents. Scramble absorbed Bulldozer and Piledriver into his body before being killed by the Hood.

References

External links
 
 AlphaFlight.Net Alphanex Entry on - Scramble
 AlphaFlight.Net Alphanex Entry on - Omega
 Uncannyxmen.net Issue Summary: Alpha Flight Volume 1 #30
 Uncannyxmen.net Issue Summary: Alpha Flight Volume 1 #48
 Uncannyxmen.net Issue Summary: Alpha Flight Volume 1 #49
Characters created by Bill Mantlo
Characters created by Mike Mignola
Comics characters introduced in 1986
Fictional Canadian people
Marvel Comics characters with accelerated healing
Marvel Comics military personnel
Marvel Comics mutants
Marvel Comics supervillains
Fictional United States Army personnel
Fictional Vietnam War veterans